William Michael Morgan (born May 13, 1993) is an American country music singer from Vicksburg, Mississippi. He was signed to Warner Bros. Nashville.

His debut single "I Met a Girl", reached number two on the Country Airplay chart and number eight on the Hot Country Songs chart in October 2016; the song was co-written with Sam Hunt. The album's second single "Missing", was released to country radio on November 7, 2016. His debut studio album Vinyl, was released on September 30, 2016. Morgan parted ways with Warner Bros. Nashville in January 2019.

Discography

Albums

Extended plays

Singles

Music videos

References

1993 births
American male singer-songwriters
American country singer-songwriters
Musicians from Vicksburg, Mississippi
Country musicians from Mississippi
Warner Records artists
Living people
Singer-songwriters from Mississippi
21st-century American singers
21st-century American male singers